Kimberly A. Taylor (born 1978) is an American politician serving as a member of the Virginia House of Delegates for the 63rd district. A member of the Republican Party, she defeated incumbent Democratic delegate Lashrecse Aird in the 2021 election. Taylor represents parts of Chesterfield, Dinwiddie, and Prince George counties, taking in the city of Petersburg and parts of Hopewell.

Early life and education 
Taylor was born in 1978 in Petersburg, Virginia. After graduating from high school, she earned a bachelor's degree in psychology from Virginia Commonwealth University.

Career 
Following her graduation, she worked with the Richmond Times-Dispatch in retail sales. Before entering politics, Taylor co-owned two automobile repair shops in Chesterfield and Moseley, along with her husband.

Virginia House of Delegates 
Taylor announced her candidacy for the 63rd district in January 2021, challenging Democratic incumbent Lashrecse Aird. In the November 2021 general election, she narrowly defeated Aird in her bid for re-election by a margin of 512 votes in an upset. Taylor's victory was the tipping point necessary for the Republican Party to regain majority control in the House of Delegates. Taylor took office, along with the rest of the 162nd Virginia General Assembly, on January 12, 2022.

Personal life 
Taylor is married to Andrew "Butch" Perry. They have one daughter and reside in Dinwiddie County.

References

External links 
 Campaign website

1978 births
21st-century American politicians
21st-century American women politicians
Christians from Virginia
Living people
Republican Party members of the Virginia House of Delegates
People from Dinwiddie County, Virginia
Politicians from Petersburg, Virginia
Virginia Commonwealth University alumni
Women state legislators in Virginia